The 2011–12 Basketball Cup of Serbia is the 6th season of the Serbian 2nd-tier men's cup tournament.

Belgrade-based team Radnički FMP won the Cup.

Bracket
Source: Basketball Federation of Serbia

Qualifications

See also 
 2011–12 Radivoj Korać Cup
 2011–12 Basketball League of Serbia

References

External links 
 Basketball Competitions of Serbia

Basketball Cup of Serbia
Cup